The 1983–84 season was Kilmarnock's 82nd in Scottish League Competitions.

Scottish First Division

Scottish League Cup

Second round

Group stage

Group 4 final table

Scottish Cup

See also 
List of Kilmarnock F.C. seasons

References

External links 
https://www.fitbastats.com/kilmarnock/team_results_season.php

Kilmarnock F.C. seasons
Kilmarnock